Goran Krstevski (born 29 March 1996) is a Macedonian handball player for CSM Focșani and the North Macedonian national team.

He participated at the 2017 Men's Junior World Handball Championship.

References

External links

1996 births
Living people
Macedonian male handball players
People from Resen, North Macedonia
Expatriate handball players
Macedonian expatriate sportspeople in Austria